Erotically Charged Dance Songs for the Desperate is the first EP by hardcore/metal band Gay for Johnny Depp. It was released in 2004 and is now out of print.

Track listing
"Kill the Cool Kids" – 1:59
"Lights Out" – 2:20
"She Said "I Like This One"" – 2:37
"At Least Be a Target" – 2:11
"He Loved It So Much He Went Mad" – 1:31

Personnel
Sid Jagger - Guitar
Marty Leopard - Vocals
F. Cokboi - Bass
JJ Samanen - Drums

External links
 Gay for Johnny Depp official site

Gay for Johnny Depp albums
2004 debut EPs